The bonus rule was a rule instituted by Major League Baseball in 1947 that prevented teams from assigning certain players to farm teams. The rule stipulated that when a major league team signed a player to a contract in excess of $4,000 ($ today), the team was required to keep that player on their 25-man active roster for two full seasons.
Any team that failed to comply with the rule lost the rights to that player's contract, and the player was then exposed to the waiver wire. Once a player remained with the team for two full seasons, he could be assigned to a farm team without repercussions. The rule went through several variations until it was finally abolished in 1965, when the Major League Baseball draft was initiated.

History of the rule 
In the late 1930s and early 1940s, major league franchises found themselves bidding against one another for the services of young players.  These engagements subsided when World War II broke out.  When the war ended, the bidding wars resumed.

This competition for the best amateur athletes resulted in skyrocketing signing bonuses. In 1947, Major League Baseball implemented the bonus rule.  The rule prevented the wealthiest teams from signing all of the best players and from stashing those players in their farm systems.  Additionally, the bonus market was weakened as a result of inhibited competition.  In return, this limited labor costs.

The legitimacy of the rule was challenged several times after it was initially implemented.  In December 1950, the rule was rescinded.  In 1952, a committee chaired by Branch Rickey revived the rule.  It was this iteration of the rule that stated a team had to place the players who met the bonus rule criteria on the major league roster immediately.  Furthermore, the player had to remain on the roster for two years from the signing date. Although the players were signed as a result of their potential, some players were not able to succeed.   In an extreme case, pitcher Tom Qualters was on the active roster of the Philadelphia Phillies for all of 1953 and 1954, but pitched only 1/3 of an inning in one game of the 1953 season, and did not get into a game at all in 1954.  Qualters did not appear in his second major league game until 1957, and never recorded a victory as a big league pitcher.

The New York Yankees worked out a deal with the Kansas City Athletics in which the Athletics signed Clete Boyer to a contract.  The Athletics used Boyer sparingly for the two years they had him. Then, just days after the first date at which the Athletics could send Boyer down to the minor leagues, they traded him to the Yankees as the player to be named later from a trade the previous winter.  This trade did not sit well with the owners of the other American League teams. They claimed that the Yankees had used the Athletics to hold Boyer.  However, the deal was allowed by the league.

Incidents like the Clete Boyer trade showed how the bonus rule could be circumvented.  Rumor also spread that teams were ignoring the rule and bribing players.  In 1958, both leagues voted to rescind the rule.  In addition, they rescinded it retroactively.  This eliminated the major league roster requirement for the players signed in 1957.

After the league added four new teams (the Angels and Senators, followed by the Colt .45s and Mets), the bonus rule was reintroduced in 1962.  The difference between the new version of the rule and the previous one was that a player had to spend just one full season on the roster instead of two seasons. Franchises were also allowed one exception, a "designated player" who could play in the minor leagues but would still count against the major league team's 25-man active roster.

In June 1965, the Major League Baseball draft was introduced. Each drafted player was required to negotiate with the team that selected him.  This brought an end to the bonus rule.

Bonus babies 
Bonus babies were the group of amateur baseball players who went straight to the major leagues between the years 1947 and 1965 and received a signing bonus in excess of $4,000.  The bonus rule prevented the player from spending time in the Minor League Baseball system that was, and is, the training ground for most professional baseball players in the United States, and came under criticism because it often caused such a player to languish on a major league bench instead of gaining experience in the minors.

Hall of Fame 
Five of the 1947–1965 bonus babies had Hall of Fame careers: Al Kaline, Harmon Killebrew, Sandy Koufax, Roberto Clemente and Catfish Hunter. Of the five, only Killebrew, a bonus baby for the Washington Senators, saw any minor league service time once his mandatory bonus baby period expired. Kaline, Koufax, and Hunter never played in the minor leagues. Clemente was signed by the Dodgers who attempted to hide him in the minors, but was discovered by a scout for the Pittsburgh Pirates and drafted by them in 1955.

See also 
List of baseball players who went directly to Major League Baseball

Notes 

Major League Baseball labor relations
Major League Baseball rules